The 2006–07 season was the 62nd full season of league football for Ipswich Town. The club played in the Football League Championship for the 2006–07 season, whilst also competing in the FA Cup and League Cup.

Events
5 June 2006 - Jim Magilton replaces Joe Royle as manager.
19 November 2006 - Town defeat Norwich City 3–1 in the East Anglian derby, with Danny Haynes scoring two late goals.
28 April 2007 - Ipswich effectively relegate Leeds United with a draw at Elland Road. The game is stopped half a minute early because of crowd trouble, with the responsible fans removed from the ground. Referee Nigel Miller controversially brings the teams back out to end the game. Ipswich hold on to a draw and would have won the game had their goals not been ruled out for offside.

Season summary

Pre-season

The 2006–07 season was a transitional season for Ipswich Town. Joe Royle left his position as manager and was replaced by Jim Magilton on 5 June 2006, who was making the move from player to manager. Magilton continued to be registered as a player at the club although he would only feature in the first-team in an emergency situation. Following his appointment he stated that he was intending to play in reserve team games to use his experience to help the club's young players develop. Bryan Klug was appointed as first-team coach alongside Magilton. He thanked Ipswich's fans for the positive reaction to his appointment once he had been revealed as the club's new manager. 

Following his appointment as manager, Magilton named Canadian international centre-back Jason de Vos as Ipswich's new club captain. Magilton also appointed new members to his coaching and back-room staff. Steve Foley was appointed as a coach on 9 June, who had been appointed to work with both the academy and first-team, club physio Dave Williams was named the head of Ipswich's newly created sports science department.

Ipswich were still financially recovering from administration, with limited funds restricting the playing budget. Magilton's first signing as manager saw Alex Bruce arrive from Birmingham City on a free transfer on 2 August 2006. Ian Westlake was sold to Leeds United on 4 August for a reported fee of £400,000, potentially rising to £500,000 with add-ons, in a deal which also saw Dan Harding move in the other direction, signing a three-year deal with Ipswich. French midfielder Sylvain Legwinski also joined on a free transfer from Fulham on 31 August, signing a two-year contract with the club. Strikers Sam Parkin and Nicky Forster also departed for fees, joining Luton Town and Hull City respectively before the end of August. Magilton also utilized the loan market, with midfielders Simon Walton and Mark Noble joining on loan from Charlton Athletic and West Ham United respectively. Republic of Ireland striker Jon Macken also joined on loan until January from Crystal Palace.

August to December
The season began on the 5 August, with Magilton taking charge of his first game as Ipswich Town manager at home to Crystal Palace at Portman Road. Despite taking the lead through a first-half goal from the previous season's top scorer Nicky Forster, Ipswich suffered a 1–2 opening day defeat due to second-half goals from Jobi McAnuff and former Ipswich Town striker James Scowcroft. The tough start to the season continued for Magilton's Ipswich as they lost the following two games away to Wolverhampton Wanderers and Leicester City. A 0–0 draw with Hull City followed before Ipswich earned their first victory of the season, defeating Queens Park Rangers 3–1 away at Loftus Road, with goals from Simon Walton, Jason de Vos and Dean Bowditch.

The first three months of the season saw Ipswich pick up six wins, three draws and six losses from their opening fifteen league games. Whilst also exiting the league cup 2–4 on penalties at the first round stage to Peterborough United, following a 2–2 draw after extra time. On 29 October, Ipswich defeated Luton Town 5–0 at Portman Road, with Alan Lee scoring a Hat-trick, this was the team's largest winning margin of the season. The 19 November saw the first East Anglian derby of the season take place, with Ipswich facing local rivals Norwich City at Portman Road. Despite going behind in the 26th minute to a goal from Luke Chadwick, Sylvain Legwinski equalized for Ipswich in the 40th minute, leaving the game at 1–1 going into half-time. With the game tied at 1–1, Ipswich academy graduate Danny Haynes came on as a substitute for Billy Clarke in the 76th minute and scored within a minute of entering onto the pitch, putting Ipswich 2–1 ahead. Haynes scored again in the 90th minute with a curling shot from the edge of the 18 yard box that went in off the post. Ipswich defeated Norwich City 3–1 in the East Anglian Derby. After the match Magilton said of Haynes: "Danny Haynes will get hero status here and seems to enjoy local derbies. I felt it was time to put him on because the pitch was strength-sapping and Danny's pace will always cause problems against tired legs."

January transfer window
The January transfer window saw multiple new signings join the club. The first deal to take place was the permanent signing of midfielder Gary Roberts from Accrington Stanley, following a successful loan spell. Defender David Wright was signed from Wigan Athletic on 11 January for an undisclosed fee, whilst George O'Callaghan was also signed from League of Ireland side Cork City following a four-month spell of training with Ipswich. The club's final permanent deal of the January transfer window was the signing of Jonathan Walters from Chester City for a reported fee of £100,000.

January to May
Ipswich's form had stuttered through to the end of December, however they started the new year with a 1–0 home win over Birmingham City at Portman Road, with Gavin Williams netting the winning goal in the 90th minute. Ipswich were drawn away to Chester City in the FA Cup third round on 6 January. The first tie ended in a 0–0 draw, resulting in a replay scheduled for the 16 January, which Ipswich won 1–0, with Matt Richards scoring the winning goal. On 20 January Ipswich defeated local rivals Colchester United 3–2, with goals from Alan Lee, Sylvain Legwinski and Danny Haynes. The second round of the FA Cup took place on 27 January, with Ipswich drawn at home to Swansea City. Alan Lee scored the only goal of the match, converting a penalty in the 64 minute to send Ipswich into the next round of the cup. Ipswich suffered from a poor run of form during February, with the team going on a four-game losing run throughout the month, whist also exiting the FA Cup due to a 0–1 away loss to Watford at Vicarage Road.

The team's form improved during the later stages of the season. On 6 March, Ipswich recorded a 5–2 away win over Hull City, the team's biggest away win of the season. On 7 April, Ipswich defeated Barnsley 5–1 at Portman Road, the third time in the season that they had scored five goals in a single game. Ipswich faced rivals Norwich City for the second East Anglian derby of the season on 22 April away at Carrow Road. The match ended in a 1–1 draw, with David Wright's second-half equalizer leveling the tie. The following match Ipswich faced Leeds United at Elland Road. The match ended in a 1–1 draw, a result which effectively relegated Leeds to League One. The game was stopped half a minute early because of crowd trouble, with the responsible fans removed from the ground. Referee Nigel Miller controversially brought the teams back out to end the game. Ipswich held on to draw the game and would have won the game had their goals not been ruled out for offside. Ipswich's final game of the season saw them host Cardiff City at Portman Road. Ipswich ended the season with a 3–1 victory following a goal from Francis Jeffers, and a brace from Jonathan Walters. Ipswich finished 14th in the Championship in the 2006–07 season. Irish striker Alan Lee finished the season as Ipswich's top goal-scorer with 17 goals in all competitions, 16 of which were scored in the league. French midfielder Sylvain Legwinski won both the club's Supporters' and Players' Player of the Year awards for the season, whilst Tommy Smith won the club's Academy Player of the Year award. Welshman Gavin Williams won the club's Goal of the Season award for his strike in the 1–0 home victory over Leeds United on 16 December.

First-team squad
Squad at end of season

Left club during season

Reserve squad

Coaching staff

Pre-season
Preparations for the 2006–07 season included a pre-season tour of the Netherlands and Belgium, in which Ipswich played friendly matches against Dutch sides Willem II and Dordrecht, Zulte Waregem from Belgium and Italian side Lazio.

Legend

Competitions

Football League Championship

League table

Legend

Ipswich Town's score comes first

Matches

FA Cup

League Cup

Transfers

Transfers in

Loans in

Transfers out

Loans out

Total transfer fees paid:  £250,000
Total transfer fees received:  £990,000
Does not take into account undisclosed fees.

Squad statistics
All statistics updated as of end of season

Appearances and goals

|-
! colspan=14 style=background:#dcdcdc; text-align:center| Goalkeepers

|-
! colspan=14 style=background:#dcdcdc; text-align:center| Defenders

|-
! colspan=14 style=background:#dcdcdc; text-align:center| Midfielders

|-
! colspan=14 style=background:#dcdcdc; text-align:center| Forwards

|-
! colspan=14 style=background:#dcdcdc; text-align:center| Players transferred out during the season

Goalscorers

Clean sheets

Disciplinary record

Starting 11
Considering starts in all competitions

Season statistics

Attendance
Highest: 28,355 (vs. Colchester United, 20 January, Championship)
Lowest: 19,337 (vs. Preston North End, 19 October, Championship)
Cumulative league attendance - home: 516,231 - away: 114,260 - total: 630,491
Average attendance (league): 22,890
Ratio: Average attendance to stadium capacity: 71%

Matches
Biggest win: 5–0 (vs. Luton Town, 29 October, home, Championship)
Heaviest defeat: 1–5 (vs. West Bromwich Albion, 14 October, home, Championship)
Longest winning run (league games): 3 (25 August – 12 September), (17 March – 7 April)
Longest losing run (league games): 3 (6 August – 12 August), (29 September – 17 October)

Awards

Player awards

References

Ipswich Town F.C. seasons
Ipswich Town